This is a list of compositions by Swan Hennessy (1866–1929).

Hennessy was an American composer of Irish family background who studied in Germany, lived in England and Italy, but spent most of his career (from about 1903) in France.

He was a most accomplished composer of chamber music in many diverse instrumentations and of piano music. The following is a list of compositions in a table sorted by opus number. This is followed by a list sorted by genre.

List of compositions by opus number
The following table shows a chronological list, based on Klein (2019). Dates given are for publication, not composition.

List of compositions by genre

Piano music
Ländliche Skizzen [op. 1?]. Contains: 1. Am Bache; 2. Waldvöglein; 3. Ländler; 4. Ringellied; 5. Legende; 6. Die Sägemühle (1885)
Ein Spinnerliedchen op. 2 (1886)
Two Studies: Staccato and Legato op. 4 (c.1886–7)
Carneval-Studien op. 6 (1887)
Im Gebirg (In the Mountains) op. 7. 4 Klavierstücke (1887)
Album-Blätter op. 8 (1887)
Étude-Fantaisie op. 9 (1888)
Miniatures. Cinq petites pièces op. 11 (1889)
Study (1890)
Variations sur un thème original dans le style irlandais op. 12 (1902)
Deux Études pour la main gauche seule (1906)
Mazurka et Polonaise op. 17 (1906)
Petit album op. 18 (1907). Contains: 1. En route (On the Road); 2. L'Auberge (The Inn); 3. Enfants qui passent (Passing Children); 4. Aux temps passés (From Old Times); 5. Danseuse sur la scène (Ballet Girl on the Stage); 6. Sonatine; 7. Scherzette.
Aus dem Kinderleben. 6 Tonbilder op. 19 (c.1907–8). Contains: 1. Puppenwiegenlied; 2. Puppentanz; 3. Im Wald; 4. Erster Walzer; 5. Schläfriges Kind; 6. Auf Wiedersehen.
Au village. Petite suite caractéristique (1907). Contains: 1. Noce campagnarde; 2. Fillettes; 3. Basse-Cour; 4. Sur l'herbe; 5. Au bord du ruisseau.
Au bord de la forêt op. 21 (c.1907–8)
Eaux fortes op. 24 (1908). Contains: 1. Sérénade espagnole; 2. Bergérie; 3. Petite mazurka.
Étude op. 25 (1907)
Nouvelles feuilles d'album op. 27 (1908). Contains: 1. Madrigal; 2. Canon; 3. Style irlandais; 4. Petites scènes parisiennes.
Variations sur un air irlandais ancien op. 28 (1908)
Valses op. 32 (1903)
Petite suite irlandaise, d'après les airs anciens de la collection Petrie (1909), for piano 4-hands
Croquis de femmes op. 33 (1911). Contains: 1. Au couvent: 2. Bavardes; 3. La Vieille tante; 4. Mondaine; 5. Jeunes anglaises; 6. Dans les jardins du sérail; 7. Charmeuse de serpents.
Petite suite op. 34 (1911)
Kinder-Album. 24 kleine Präludien in verschiedenen Ton- und Taktarten op. 35 (1910)
Fêtes. Deux Morceaux descriptifs op. 36 (1911). Contains: 1. Fête de village au XVIIIme siècle; 2. Fête populaire dans la banlieue de Paris au XXme siècle.Incunabula op. 39 (1912). Contains: 1. Berceuse; 2. Bébé dort; 3. Croquemitaine.En passant ... (études d'après nature) op. 40 (1912). Contains: 1. Petit pâtre sur les hauts pâturages; 2. Champ de blé au clair de lune; 3. Dans une petite ville flamande le dimanche; 4. Cimes neigeuses; 5. Sieste en chemin de fer.Valses caprices op. 41 (1912). Contains: 1. Valse rustique; 2. Valse canaille; 3. Valse distraite; 4. Valse boiteuse; 5. Valse érotique; 6. À la Reger; 7. Encore une valse.Gitaneries op. 42 (1912)Sonatine op. 43 (1912)Sentes et chemins (Nouvelles études d'après nature) op. 44 (1912). Contains: 1. Ouvriers allants à l'usine; 2. Promenades du philosophie; 3. A travers bois; 4. Cornemuse en têt; 5. Sur la route d'Amalfi; 6. Sentier de Meudon au printemps; 6. Par la pluie.Pièces celtiques op. 45 (1912)Croquis parisiens op. 47 (1913). Contains: 1. Promenade matinale au Jardin du Luxembourg; 2. L'Américain qui a bien diné; 3. Dans un atelier de couturières.Impressions humoristiques op. 48 (1913). Contains: 1. Tupae. Polka; 2. Das Fräulein stand am Meere und seufzte lang und bang; 3. Napolitains; 4. En regardant une ronde de jeunes filles; 5. Chanteuse de beuglant; 6. Bébé prend sa médecine.Huit Pièces celtiques op. 51 (date uncertain)Sonatine celtique op. 53 (date uncertain)Epigrammes d'un solitaire op. 55 (1924). Contains: 1. La Forêt de Clamart à l'aube; 2. Un Jardin arabe; 3. Une Pagode indochinoise; 4. Un Berceau; 5. Un vieux cimetière; 6. Un Souvenir lointain.Trois Pièces exotiques op. 57 (1924). Contains: 1. Fillettes brunes; 2. Le Goût de la cannelle; 3. Nègre endimanché.Étude de concert op. 60 (1924)Douze Canons à deux voix à tous les intervalles op. 64 (1926)Rapsodie irlandaise op. 67 (c.1926)Banlieues. Six Petites pièces op. 69 (1926)À la manière de ... 18 Pastiches, 3 volumes (1927)À la manière de ... Six Nouveaux pastiches, 4th volume to above (1927)

Vocal musicVier Lieder op. 3 (1886). Contains: 1. Leise zieht durch mein Gemüth; 2. Die blauen Frühlingsaugen; 3. Mädchen mit dem rothen Mündchen; 4. Zum Schluß: "Sag, wo ist dein schönes Liebchen".
[songs] op. 5 (1887), title unknown. The only published movement is no. 1: The Blackbird has a Golden Bill.Annie. Chanson écossaise (1907)Quatre Mélodies op. 23 (1908). Contains: 1. Lydia; 2. Epiphanie; 3. Là-bas!; 4. Le Revenant.La Fille aux cheveux de lin. Chanson écossaise (1913)Trois Chansons espagnoles op. 42bis (1923). Contains: 1. [unknown]; 2. Auf den Wällen Salamankas; 3. Neben mir wohnt Don Henriquez.Le Mort joyeux op. 56a (1924)Trois Mélodies op. 66 (1925). Contains: 1. Si la distance qui nous séparé; 2. Paysage; 3. Chanson écossaise.Trois Chansons celtiques op. 72 (1927). Contains: 1. [unknown]; 2. Le Chanson du rouet; 3. [unknown].Deux Mélodies (published 1934). Contains: 1. La Lune; 2. À deux.

Chamber music
DuosBerceuse (1901) for violin and pianoSonate en style irlandais op. 14 (1904) for violin and pianoRapsodie celtique op. 50 (1915) for violin and pianoSonate celtique op. 62 (1924) for viola and piano; as Sonatine celtique op. 62 arrangement by the composer for violin and pianoRapsodie gaélique op. 63 (1925) for cello and pianoDeux Morceaux op. 68 (1926) for saxophone and pianoQuatre Morceaux op. 71 (1929) for alto-saxophone or viola and pianoPièce celtique op. 74 (1928) for cello or bassoon and pianoDeuxième Sonatine op. 80 (1929) for violin and pianoSonatine op. 81 (1929) for cello and piano

TriosLieder an den Mond op. 10 (1888) for violin, cello, pianoPetit trio celtique op. 52 (1921) for violin, viola, celloTrio op. 54 (1921) for 2 clarinets and bassoonTrio op. 70 (1926) for flute, violin, bassoon

QuartetsPrémier Quatuor (Suite) op. 46 (1912) for string quartetDeuxième Quatuor op. 49 (1920) for string quartetVariations sur un thème de six notes op. 58 (1924) for flute, violin, viola, celloQuatre Pièces celtiques op. 59 (1925) for cor anglais, violin, viola, celloTroisième Quatuor op. 61 (1927) for string quartetSérénade op. 65 (1925) for string quartetQuatrième Quatuor'' op. 75 (1930) for string quartet

References

Hennessy, Swan